The  is a railway line in Tokyo, Japan, operated by the private railway operator Seibu Railway.

The line is part of the Seibu Shinjuku group of railway lines and connects suburban areas of western Tokyo to Seibu and JR main lines that run to central Tokyo. The line passes through the cities of Higashimurayama, Kodaira, and Kokubunji.

History
At this time,  was the only intermediate station on the Higashi-Murayama to Kokubunji section. The line was electrified in 1948. Two additional intermediate stations were later opened between Ogawa and Kokubunji: Takanodai opened in 1948, and Koigakubo opened in 1955. Setting up of Hanesawa and track doubling from Koigakubo to Hanesawa was carried out in 1968. Since July 2008, recorded announcements on trains have been provided in English in addition to Japanese.

Stations

Operations
Seibu 101 series, 2000 series, and 3000 series EMUs are used on this line. These trains are painted in Seibu Railway's distinctive yellow livery. All trains are local services and stop at all stations. Trains take 12 minutes to complete the  journey.
The  double-track section allows 8 trains per hour to operate in each direction during peak. At Kokubunji Station, trains use only a single platform (platform 5) at the terminus.

References

External links

 Seibu Railway route map

 
Kokubunji Line
Railway lines in Tokyo
Western Tokyo
1067 mm gauge railways in Japan
Railway lines opened in 1894